Minyadidae is a family of sea anemones belonging to the order Actiniaria.

Genera:
 Actinecta de Blainville, 1830
 Echinactis Milne-Edwards & Haime, 1851
 Nautactis Milne-Edwards & Haime, 1857
 Oceanactis Moseley, 1877
 Phlyctaenominyas Andres, 1883
 Phyllominyas Andres, 1883

References

Actinioidea
Cnidarian families